Aylin Tezel (born 29 November 1983) is a German actress and dancer. She was born in Bünde. Her father is a Turkish-born medical doctor practicing in Bielefeld, Germany, and her mother is a nurse. She is a middle child, having an older sister and a younger brother. She had her breakthrough with a main role in the film "Almanya - Welcome to Germany" which premiered at the Berlin International Film Festival in 2011 and with the main role in the film "Am Himmel der Tag" (En: "Breaking Horizons") for which she received the Best Actress Award at the Torino Film Festival in 2012.

Life and career 
Aylin Tezel was born in Bünde and grew up in the Bielefeld district of Sennestadt. There she danced from the age of six and graduated from the Hans Ehrenberg academic high school. She studied acting at the Ernst Busch Academy of Dramatic Arts in Berlin but left the school in her second year. After her film debut in the arthouse feature "Unschuld" (2008) she played a central role in Oliver Kienle's award- winning film "" (First Steps Award 2010).

The actress was especially noted for her role in Yasemin Şamdereli's film "Almanya - Welcome to Germany", which premiered at the 61st Berlin International Film Festival and won the Deutscher Filmpreis (German Film Award) in 2011. The film was a big hit in German cinemas and had cinema releases in many countries. During Christmas 2011, Tezel was seen as Cinderella in Uwe Janson's TV film "Aschenputtel" and soon afterwards as one of the main recurring characters, young cop Nora Dalay, in Germany's most popular cop series Tatort. Irish director Shimmy Marcus gave her the main part in his short film "Rhinos" (2011) which premiered at the CFC Worldwide Short Film Festival in Toronto, Canada and was nominated for an Award at the Irish Film & Television Awards in 2013.

In 2012 she was seen in main roles in the feature films "3 Zimmer/Küche/Bad" (engl. "Move") and "Breaking Horizons" (original Title: "Am Himmel der Tag"). Pola Beck's "Breaking Horizons" won the Award for Best Film in German-language feature film competition at the 8th Zurich Film Festival and Aylin Tezel received the Best Actress Award at the 30th Torino Film Festival.

Aylin Tezel filmed Marco Kreuzpaintner's feature Coming In which was released by Warner Bros. in October 2014, playing female lead Heidi who falls for a gay star- hairdresser (Kostja Ullmann). In the feature "Macho Man", the film version of a German bestseller she plays the female lead alongside German actor Christian Ulmen and Danish actor Dar Salim. The film was released in 2015 by Universum Film.
She played female lead Sabine in Robert Manson's english-language debut feature film "Lost in the Living". The film was released in cinemas in Ireland and Germany in 2017 and was later picked up by Amazon Prime.

Tezel took voice lessons from the late voice coach Julia Wilson-Dickson in London to improve her opportunities for English language roles.

In 2017 Aylin Tezel had a recurring role in the Canadian CBC Television spy thriller television series X Company. She played the Jewish Polish Resistance Fighter Zosia in 6 episodes of the 3rd season alongside Warren Brown and Evelyne Brochu and spoke English with a Polish Accent for the part.

In June 2020 Amazon Studios released the thriller 7500 after it had premiered in competition at Locarno Festival and was released in cinemas in Germany and Austria. Joseph Gordon-Levitt plays the main role, a co-pilot who's plane is hijacked. Tezel plays his girlfriend, stewardess Gökce.

In February 2021 ZDFneo originals released the 6-part miniseries Unbroken in which Tezel plays the main role, Alex, a tough cop trying to find her child after having been kidnapped. Already after the first week of streaming the TV series was announced to be ZDFneo's most successful tv series on ZDF's streaming channel ZDF Mediathek.

Tezel also wrote and directed the short film Phoenix (2020) starring Irish Actors Killian Scott, Bríd Brennan and German Actress Leonie Benesch which premiered at Max Ophüls Festival.

Selected filmography

Awards and nominations

References

External links
 
 Represented by London Talent & Literary Agency Curtis Brown
 Represented by Berlin Talent Agency Die Agenten
 review Breaking Horizons at Reykjavik International Film Festival
 interview Tezel about her series "Unbroken" in Drama Quarterly February 2021

German film actresses
1983 births
Living people
People from Herford (district)
German people of Turkish descent
German television actresses
21st-century German actresses